Mike Taylor may refer to:

Music
 Mike Taylor (musician) (1938–1969), British jazz pianist and songwriter
 Mike Taylor (guitarist) (1948–2010), American songwriter and archaeologist
 Mike "Beard Guy" Taylor (died 2018), member of Walk off the Earth

Sports
 Mike Taylor (racing driver) (1934–2017), Formula One driver
 Mike Taylor (cricketer, born 1942), English cricketer
 Mike Taylor (cricketer, born 1944), English cricketer
 Mike Taylor (offensive tackle) (born 1945), American football offensive tackle
 Mike Taylor (linebacker, born 1949), American football linebacker
 Mike Taylor (linebacker, born 1989), Wisconsin Badgers linebacker
 Mike Taylor (basketball coach) (born 1972), American basketball coach
 Mike Taylor (basketball player) (born 1986), American basketball guard
 Mike Taylor (swimmer) (born 1964), British multiple sclerosis activist

Other
 Mike Taylor (Montana politician) (born 1941), American politician
 Mike Taylor (public servant), Australian
 Mike P. Taylor (born 1968), British paleontologist

See also
 Michael Taylor (disambiguation)
 Maik Taylor (born 1971), Northern Irish football goalkeeper